Rafael Nadal was the defending champion but chose not to compete this year.

Grigor Dimitrov won the title in the first hard-court edition of the tournament, defeating Kevin Anderson in the final, 7–6(7–1), 3–6, 7–6(7–5).

Seeds

Draw

Finals

Top half

Bottom half

Qualifying

Seeds

Qualifiers

Lucky loser
  Donald Young

Qualifying draw

First qualifier

Second qualifier

Third qualifier

Fourth qualifier

References
Main Draw
Qualifying Draw

2014 Abierto Mexicano Telcel